Cervelas de Lyon is a sausage that is among the specialties of Lyonnaise cuisine.

The sausage contains finely minced pork and either truffles or pistachios. Sold uncooked, the sausage has to boiled before it is eaten.

Summary

There are many varieties of Lyon sausages that have come of age with recipes handed down by the ancestors of the pork butchers from the city of Gauls. Among these, some are dry ones too, small and large, called the Rosette or Jesus.

The indigenous sausages from Lyon are, however, made to be cooked. One of the sausages, the Cervelas, are produced short and broad with prime pork stuffing with either pistachios or truffles. It derived its name from brains, since it was initially made from pork brains. On the other hand, the Sabodet, with its coarser texture, comes from Isère and is made from pork head, rind, and meat.

See also
Cervelat
Lyonnaise cuisine

References

French sausages